Moncoutant is a former commune in the Deux-Sèvres department in western France. On 1 January 2019, it was merged into the new commune Moncoutant-sur-Sèvre.

Geography

Moncoutant is located in a bocage area in northern Deux-Sèvres, on the Sèvre Nantaise, 50 km north of Niort and 15 km south of Bressuire.

Economy

Moncoutant is a mainly agricultural town. However, it also has numerous shops and a few industries. Since 2001, it has also become a tourist center, thanks to the opening of the fishing holiday center Pescalis.

History

Points of interest

See also
Communes of the Deux-Sèvres department

References

Former communes of Deux-Sèvres